Robin Lyn Sherwood (born January 24, 1952) is an American actress, best known for her roles in Tourist Trap (1979), Blow Out (1981), and as the role of Carol Kersey in Charles Bronson's film Death Wish II (1982).

Filmography

References

External links
 
 
 

Living people
20th-century American actresses
Actresses from Miami
American female models
American film actresses
American stage actresses
American television actresses
1952 births
21st-century American women